Simon Willard (1753–1848) was an American clockmaker.

Simon Willard may also refer to:
 Simon Willard (Massachusetts colonist) (1605–1676), an early Massachusetts fur trader and colonist
 Simon Willard (Connecticut colonist)

See also
 Descendants of Simon Willard